Urania is a science centre and scientific society in Berlin, Germany.

Its aim is to communicate the most recent scientific findings to the broad public. With its 2000 members,

Urania organises more than 1000 events per year, attracting about 130,000 visitors.

Since its centenary in 1988, the society has awarded the Urania Medaille annually to individuals who have supported significantly the implementation of its aims. Recipients are Nobel laureates in natural science as well as social scientists, artists, and politicians.

The Berlin International Film Festival uses the centre's 866-seat theatre to host film premieres in the Generation section.

References

Further reading 
 Max Wilhelm Meyer: Die Urania nach ihrer Fertigstellung. In: Himmel und Erde 2/1890. Teil 1], [http://vlp.mpiwg-berlin.mpg.de/library/data/lit38650 Teil 2
 Max Wilhelm Meyer (ed.): Illustrirter Leitfaden der Astronomie, Physik und Mikroskopie in Form eines Führers durch die Urania zu Berlin. 1892.
 Denkschrift zum 25jährigen Bestehen der Gesellschaft Urania (1888–1913) 1913.

External links

Scientific organisations based in Germany
Science centers
1888 establishments in Germany
Museums established in 1888
Organisations based in Berlin